St. Agnes Academy is a Dominican college-preparatory school for young women grades 9 through 12 in the Chinatown area and in the Greater Sharpstown district of Houston, Texas. The school operates within the Roman Catholic Archdiocese of Galveston-Houston.

History

Pauline Gannon, a Dominican Sister, founded St. Agnes Academy in 1905. St. Agnes opened on February 11, 1906, at 3901 Fannin Street in what is now considered to be Midtown. The school was named after Saint Agnes of Rome. The school was founded as a grade one through 12 school with boarding facilities. The University of Texas and the Texas State Board of Education accredited St. Agnes in 1917. In 1939, boarding was discontinued. In 1952, St. Agnes began to serve grades 9 through 12 only. In 1963, the school moved from its Fannin Street location to its current location at 9000 Bellaire Boulevard in the Sharpstown area of Houston, Texas.  The school motto is Veritas, meaning truth.

Location
In September 1963, the school moved across town to its current location at 9000 Bellaire Boulevard (near the intersection of Gessner Drive and Bellaire Boulevard). St. Agnes Academy is located adjacent to Strake Jesuit College Preparatory, a Jesuit school for high school boys. The two schools hold some joint classes together, including choir and band.

Culture
In 1974 Texas Monthly stated that St. Agnes had an image of being for "older Catholic families" since many alumnae of the school sent their daughters to attend St. Agnes. The magazine stated that students from both St. Agnes and Duchense, another Houston-area Catholic girls' school, originated from "mostly business and professional people with money."

St. Agnes Academy strives to instill the four pillars of Dominican tradition (Prayer, Study, Community, and Preaching) into the intellects and hearts of each student. At St. Agnes Academy, students are encouraged to develop intellectual curiosity, to work for social justice and to act with integrity and compassion. The Academy's head of school likes to tell her students, "Take on the world with a Bible in one hand and the news in the other," meaning that students should be aware of the social world around them while also carrying on Catholic traditions that encompass moral choices and spiritual beliefs. Students are given facts and logic to think for themselves, rather than being told what to think. St. Agnes Academy is a great institution for any young women seeking to work and study hard to become a well rounded, empowered individual ready to change the world around her.

Alumnae Association

St. Agnes Academy alumnae are a part of a network of more than 10,000 graduates as of 2018.

Notable alumnae
Hanan Alattar (Class of 1994), operatic soprano
Patricia Gras (Class of 1979), journalist
Alexis Bledel (Class of 1999), actress
Britt Maren, model
Ruth Messinger, Manhattan Borough President
Sara Moulton, chef, author and television personality
Elisabeth Murdoch, media executive
Victoria Newhouse, architecture critic
Diane Paulus, opera and theater director. Artistic Director, American Repertory Theater
Mary Louise Perlman, musician
Kathleen Ridder, philanthropist, educator, writer, equality for women activist
Mary Rodgers, children's author and composer
Anne Roiphe, journalist, novelist
Katie Roiphe, writer
Niki de Saint Phalle, artist
Dorothy Schiff, publisher of the New York Post
Rose Schlossberg
Tatiana Schlossberg
Kyra Sedgwick, actor
Maggie Shnayerson, journalist and blogger
Helen Farr Sloan, educator, artist, philanthropist
Sarah Solovay, singer-songwriter
Kim Stolz, fashion model and television personality
Marina Vaizey, art critic and author
Elizabeth Chai Vasarhelyi, Academy Award winner, director and producer of documentary films
Emily Vermeule, scholar and archaeologist
Erica Wagner, literary editor for The Times

See also

 Christianity in Houston

References

External links

Roman Catholic Archdiocese of Galveston–Houston
St. Agnes Academy

Roman Catholic secondary schools in Houston
High schools in Harris County, Texas
Dominican schools in the United States
Girls' schools in Texas
Educational institutions established in 1906
Private high schools in Houston
1906 establishments in Texas